The  is an archaeological site with the ruins of a Nara period Buddhist temple in the Ishii-Ninji neighborhood of the town of Ishiii, Tokushima Prefecture Japan. Its ruins were designated as a National Historic Site in 1973.

History
These temples were built to a semi-standardized template, and served both to spread Buddhist orthodoxy to the provinces, and to emphasize the power of the Nara period centralized government under the Ritsuryō system. While the sites of most of the kokubun-ji monasteries are either known or have been discovered, very few sites of the kokubun-niji nunneries are known.

The Awa Kokubun-niji site is located is located on the alluvial plain formed by the confluence of the Yoshino River and the Akui Rivers. Subsequent archaeological excavations found the foundation stones for the   Kondō and North Gate, the remains of the cloister and portions of a moat. From traces of a surrounding earthen palisade, the temple compound was found to occupy an area 158 meters square. Considering the size of the temple ruins, and its proximity to the Awa Kokubun-ji, approximately 1.5 kilometers away, it was determined that this was the ruins of the Awa Kokubun-niji. 

The site was backfilled after excavation. Currently, a guide board explaining the ruins is installed. The temple site is a five minute walk from the "Tossakakita" bus stop on the Tokushima Bus from Tokushima Station.

See also
List of Historic Sites of Japan (Tokushima)
provincial temple

References

External links
Ishii Town home page
Tokushima Prefecture home page

Buddhist temples in Tokushima Prefecture
Historic Sites of Japan
Ishii, Tokushima
Awa Province (Tokushima)
Nara period
Buddhist archaeological sites in Japan